Flubrotizolam (2-bromo-4-(2-fluorophenyl)-9-methyl-6H-thieno[3,2-f][1,2,4]triazolo[4,3-a][1,4]diazepine) is a thienotriazolodiazepine derivative with potent sedative and anxiolytic effects, which has been sold as a designer drug.

See also 
 Brotizolam
 Deschloroclotizolam
 Flubromazolam
 Fluclotizolam
 Etizolam

References 

Designer drugs
GABAA receptor positive allosteric modulators
Heterocyclic compounds with 3 rings
Nitrogen heterocycles
Sulfur heterocycles
Bromoarenes
Fluoroarenes